This is a list of songs associated with the quiet storm radio format, widely heard in the United States starting in 1976 as a form of early evening/late night easy listening music aimed at a sophisticated African American audience. Quiet storm radio programs thrived in the 1980s, with many stations across the US carrying a quiet storm program at night, and a few stations broadcasting in the format all day long. The field adapted in the 1990s as new listeners embraced neo-soul experimentation, hip hop samples and beats, as well as more explicit themes. Slow jams with quiet storm elements continued to be produced through the 2000s and 2010s.

Quiet storm songs are a mix of genres, including pop, contemporary R&B, smooth soul, smooth jazz and jazz fusion – songs having an easy-flowing and romantic character. The format first appeared in 1976 but initially it drew from songs recorded earlier. After the radio format became popular, songs were written to fit the format, and in that manner the radio style became a broad "super-genre" of music.

Songs

See also
List of contemporary R&B ballads
List of smooth jazz songs
Urban contemporary

References

Quiet storm